Robert Shayne (born Robert Shaen Dawe, October 4, 1900 – November 29, 1992) was an American actor whose career lasted for over 60 years. He was best known for portraying Inspector Bill Henderson in the American television series Adventures of Superman.

Early years
Shayne was born in Yonkers, New York. He was the son of Mr. and Mrs. Grosvenor Dawe, and he had a brother, Allen Shaen Dawe. His father was one of the founders of the United States Chamber of Commerce.

Shayne left Boston University in his senior year so that his brother could go to college. For a time, he lived in Birmingham, Alabama, writing advertising copy for a women's clothing store by day and acting in a stock theater company at night. When the store went out of business, he began acting full-time.

Career
Shayne became an actor after having worked as a reporter at the Illustrated Daily Tab in Miami, Florida. His initial acting experience came with repertory companies in Alabama, including the Birmingham Players.

Stage 
Shayne's first Broadway appearance came by 1931 in The Rap. His other Broadway shows include Yellow Jack (1934), The Cat and the Canary (1935), Whiteoaks (1938), with Ethel Barrymore, and Without Love (1942), with Katharine Hepburn.

Film 

Shayne began his film career in 1934, appearing in two features. In 1942, he became a contract actor with Warner Bros. He played many character roles in movies and television, including a film series of Warner Bros. featurettes called the "Santa Fe Trail" series such as Wagon Wheels West, and as a mad scientist in the 1953 horror film The Neanderthal Man.

He appears briefly in Alfred Hitchcock's North by Northwest, seated at a booth in a hotel bar, where his character meets Cary Grant's character, just as the latter is about to be kidnapped. He also had a small but pivotal role in the 1953 sci-fi classic Invaders From Mars as a scientist. Shayne enjoyed a brief rebirth in his career when he was cast as the blind newspaper vendor in The Flash television show; he was by this time actually blind and learned his lines by having his wife read them to him and then rehearse until he memorized them.

Television 
Shayne portrayed Police Inspector William "Bill" Henderson on the 1950s TV series Adventures of Superman. He appeared sporadically in the early episodes of the series, in part because he was accused by his second wife Mary Sheffield, and came under HUAC scrutiny and was briefly blacklisted on unproven and unspecific charges of association with Communism. As the program evolved, especially in the color episodes, he was brought into more and more of them, to the point where he was a regular on the series.

Personal life 
Shayne married Mary Crouch in 1925. They divorced in 1933 and had one daughter.

In 1933, he married Mary Sheffield. They divorced in 1943 and had one daughter.

In 1943, he married Elizabeth McDonald, with whom he had 2 more children. They remained married until his death in 1992.

Death 
Shayne died in 1992 of lung cancer at the Motion Picture Hospital in Woodland Hills, California. He was 92 years old. Shayne was buried in Forest Lawn Memorial Park, Hollywood Hills, California.

Selected filmography

 Keep 'Em Rolling (1934) - Major James Parker
 Wednesday's Child (1934) - Howard Benson
 The People's Enemy (1935) - First Department of Justice Representative (uncredited)
 Mission to Moscow (1943) - Engineer (uncredited)
 Shine On Harvest Moon (1944) - Dan Costello
 Mr. Skeffington (1944) - MacMahon
 Make Your Own Bed (1944) - Lester Knight
 Hollywood Canteen (1944) - Busboy (uncredited)
 Escape in the Desert (1945) - Radio Newscaster (voice, uncredited)
 Rhapsody in Blue (1945) - Christine's Escort (uncredited)
 Christmas in Connecticut (1945) - Dudley Beecham
 San Antonio (1945) - Captain Morgan
 The Face of Marble (1946) - Dr. David Cochran
 Three Strangers (1946) - Bertram Fallon
 I Ring Doorbells (1946) - Dick Meadows
 Behind the Mask (1946) - Brad Thomas
 Nobody Lives Forever (1946) - Chet King
 Wife Wanted (1946) - Bill Tyler
 I Cover Big Town (1947) - Chief Tom Blake
 Smash-Up: The Story of a Woman (1947) - Mr. Gordon
 Backlash (1947) - James O'Neil
 Welcome Stranger (1947) - Roy Chesley
 The Spirit of West Point (1947) - Col. Earl 'Red' Blaik
 The Swordsman (1948) - Ronald MacArden
 The Inside Story (1948) - T.W. 'Tom' O'Connor
 Best Man Wins (1948) - Judge Leonidas K. Carter
 Shaggy (1948) - Bob Calvin
 The Strange Mrs. Crane (1948) - Floyd Durant
 Let's Live a Little (1948) - Dr. Richard Field
 Loaded Pistols (1948) - Don Mason
 Law of the Barbary Coast (1949) - Michael Lodge
 Forgotten Women (1949) - Richard Marshall
 The Threat (1949) - Police Insp. Murphy
 Dynamite Pass (1950) - Jay Wingate
 Customs Agent (1950) - West Coast Chief Agent J.G. Goff
 Rider from Tucson (1950) - John Avery
 State Penitentiary (1950) - Stanley Brown
 Federal Man (1950) - Chief Agent Charles Stuart
 When You're Smiling (1950) - Jack Lacey
 Big Timber (1950) - Dixon
 Experiment Alcatraz (1950) - Barry Morgan
 Missing Women (1951) - Cincotta
 The Dakota Kid (1951) - Ace Crandall
 Criminal Lawyer (1951) - Clark P. Sommers
 Indian Uprising (1952) - Maj. Nathan Stark
 Without Warning! (1952) - Dr. Werner, Police Psychiatrist
 And Now Tomorrow (1952)
 The Ring (1952) - Jimmy - Aragon's Manager
 Mr. Walkie Talkie (1952) - Capt. Burke
 Marshal of Cedar Rock (1953) - Paul Jackson / Fake John Harper
 Prince of Pirates (1953) - Prime Minister Treeg
 The Blue Gardenia (1953) - Doctor (uncredited)
 The Lady Wants Mink (1953) - Cecil
 Invaders from Mars (1953) - Dr. Bill Wilson (uncredited)
 The Neanderthal Man (1953) - Prof. Clifford Groves
 Sea of Lost Ships (1953) - Executive Officer (uncredited)
 Flight Nurse (1953) - Surgeon (uncredited)
 Trader Tom of the China Seas (1954) - Maj. Conroy
 The Desperado (1954) - Prosecutor (uncredited)
 Tobor the Great (1954) - General #1 (uncredited)
 Murder Is My Beat (1955) - Police Captain Bert Rawley
 The Eternal Sea (1955) - Cmdr. Dean (uncredited)
 Double Jeopardy (1955) - Mr. Ross (uncredited)
 King of the Carnival (1955) - Jess Carter
 Indestructible Man (1956) - Prof. Bradshaw
 Rumble on the Docks (1956) - Judge (uncredited)
 Accused of Murder (1956) - Doctor (uncredited)
 Dance with Me, Henry (1956) - Proctor
 Hot Shots (1956) - Pierre M. Morley
 Kronos (1957) -Air Force General
 Footsteps in the Night (1957) - Fred Horner
 The Giant Claw (1957) - Gen. Van Buskirk
 Spook Chasers (1957) - Police Lt. Harris
 Death in Small Doses (1957) - FDA Chief Insp. Frank Ainsley (uncredited)
 Adventures of Superman (1952-1958, TV Series) - Inspector Launay / Police Inspector Bill Henderson
 War of the Satellites (1958) - Cole Hotchkiss
 Teenage Cave Man (1958) - The Fire Maker
 How to Make a Monster (1958) - Gary Droz
 The Lost Missile (1958) - Air Force General (uncredited)
 Revolt in the Big House (1958) - Mickey (uncredited)
 I Mobster (1958) - Senator
 The Rebel Set (1959) - Lt. Cassidy
 North by Northwest (1959) - Larry Wade (uncredited)
 Battle Flame (1959) - Lt. Norris
 Toby Tyler (1960) - Husband in Audience (uncredited)
 Valley of the Redwoods (1960) - Capt. Sid Walker
 Why Must I Die? (1960) - Charlie Munro
 Cage of Evil (1960) - Victor Delmar
 From the Terrace (1960) - Partner (uncredited)
 20,000 Eyes (1961) - Police Lieutenant
 Son of Flubber (1963) - Defense Secretary's Assistant (uncredited)
 A Tiger Walks (1964) - Governor's Adviser (uncredited)
 Runaway Girl (1965) - Walter Quillen
 Winning (1969) - Well-Wisher at Indy Victory (uncredited)
 The Arrangement (1969) - Board Member (uncredited)
 Tora! Tora! Tora! (1970) - Cmdr. William H. Buracker - Halsey's Operations Officer (uncredited)
 The Yin and the Yang of Mr. Go (1970) - U.S. Senator (uncredited)
 The Barefoot Executive (1971) - Sponsor
 The Million Dollar Duck (1971) - Refinery Executive (uncredited)
 Cool Breeze (1972) - Dr. Fields, Gynocologist (uncredited)
 The Specialist (1975) - Chairman Hopkins
 The Four Deuces (1975) - Vince

References

External links

 

Robert Shayne as a young stage actor(New York Public Library, Billy Rose Collection)

1900 births
1992 deaths
American male television actors
American male film actors
Deaths from lung cancer in California
Burials at Forest Lawn Memorial Park (Hollywood Hills)
20th-century American male actors